The 2012 season was Incheon United's ninth season in the K-League in South Korea. Incheon United will be competing in K-League and Korean FA Cup.

Current squad

Out on loan

Transfer

In

Out

Coaching staff

Match results

K-League

All times are Korea Standard Time (KST) – UTC+9

[1] Round 15 Match of Incheon vs Pohang was originally K-League restricted non-attendance match.

League table

Results summary

Results by round

Korean FA Cup

Squad statistics

Appearances
Statistics accurate as of match played 27 June 2012

Goals and assists

Discipline

References

South Korean football clubs 2012 season
2012